Idol Rebooting Project: The Unit is a South Korean survival reality show on KBS2. The concept of the show is to form male and female unit groups of nine members each, among idols who had already debuted. The show is aiming to give them a fair chance to demonstrate their talents that they may not have been able to showcase before.

Overview
KBS announced in July 2017 that they had started production of a reality show under the working title The Final 99 Match. On August 2, the show's first teaser was released under the new title The Unit, stylized as The Uni+, which stands for "You and I Plus". The show also launched its official website on the same day along with application forms available for any idols interested in joining to fill in and submit, as well as a bulletin board wherein idol recommendations from anyone can be submitted.

Booting Evaluations
During the Booting Evaluations, members of the audience vote while the contestants perform. The contestants will receive 1 Boot when 15% of the audience votes for them. When 90% of the audience vote for the contestants, which is known as "Super Boot", the whole group will be able to join the show immediately. If the contestants do not receive a "Super Boot", the Mentors will determine whether to pass each performer or not. Contestants who receive at least 1 boot from any of the mentors will be able to join the show. The Booting Evaluations were held at the Kintex Hall 9 in Ilsan between September 29 and October 1, 2017.

Theme Song
It has been reported that 126 contestants who passed the Booting Evaluations have started filming a music video from October 7 to October 9 as part of a mission. The center group will consist of nine males and nine females, and the most stand-out contestant will be the “center of the center".
On October 13, 'The Unit' has dropped the music video for the competitors' first challenge "My Turn", which also aired on that day on KBS's Music Bank, featuring Sonamoo's Euijin and IM's Kijoong as the girls' and boys' center respectively.

Voting
“The Unit” opened up voting at 10 p.m. KST on November 11, and servers crashed approximately 15 minutes later as people rushed to place their votes. Voting for the show will be exclusively done through TMON's website, with only one vote for each TMON ID. Anyone who supports the 126 contestants can participate. Each person will choose nine male contestants to form their own “Uni+ B” and nine female contestants to form “Uni+ G”. Within their top nine choices, the voters will pick their favorite contestant, who will be awarded two votes while the remaining eight will receive one vote. This will mean that each voter will be able to help out a total of 18 contestants, to achieve their dreams.

As from Episode 11 onwards, the voting system underwent a major change. It was announced that the voting will be exclusively done through “The Unit” official mobile app. Each person will pick only three contestants from “Uni+ B” and “Uni+ G” and is allowed to vote only once per day. The voting period started from 12 p.m KST on 7 January and will be closed at 11.59 p.m KST on 25 January 2018.

Post The Unit
On February 24's broadcast of The Unit's Special Show, it was announced that UNI+ B's band name will be UNB and UNI+ G's band name will be UNI.T.

Mentors
 Rain (MC)
 Lee Tae-min (Performance)
 Hyuna (Performance)
 Jo Hyun-ah (Vocals)
 Hwang Chi-yeul (Vocals)
 San E (Rap/MC)

Booting Evaluations
Color key

Note: Mentor votes for some artists weren't indicated. The number of boots are shown instead. For some artists, the number of boots were retrieved from the show's official site.

Episode 1 (October 28)

Episode 2 (November 4)

Episode 3 (November 11)

Unaired Performances

Contestants

Top 9

Color key

First voting period

Second voting period

Third voting period

Final Top 9

It was announced that the boy group would be called UNB and girl group to be called Uni.T.

Elimination chart
Color Key

Male Contestant

Female Contestant

First Mission: The Music Video
After the Booting Evaluations, the contestants were tasked to form groups of 9 for the first mission. The winning team for each gender will become the center team in the music video of the show's theme song "My Turn".

Uni+ B Evaluations

Uni+ G Evaluations

Second Mission: Restart Mission
Contestants will choose one of the given songs of different concepts that they are confident in; new teams of nine are formed. Voting of each contestant is conducted during the performances. The winning team for each gender with the most votes will win a benefit of immunity from elimination after the end of the first voting round, regardless of current overall vote rankings in the show, plus the chance to perform in Rain's comeback stage.

UNI+ G (Episode 5) 
Color key

UNI+ B (Episode 6)
Color key

Third Mission: Self-producing
Contestants will be grouped by the mentors based on the following categories: Vocal, Rap-Vocal and Performance. All performances are self-arranged by the contestants themselves, with live band accompaniments for the Vocal and Rap-Vocal categories. The mission will be based on a rival match basis. Voting of each contestant is conducted during the performances. The top 3 members of the winning category team for each gender will win a benefit of immunity from elimination at the end of the 2nd voting round, regardless of current overall vote rankings in the show.

Color key

Overall Ranking
Color key

Fourth Mission: Digital Singles Release
The remaining contestants after the 2nd Voting Announcement will form 5 groups for each gender, formed by the top 5 contestants from the Self-producing Mission. These formed groups will perform newly produced songs produced by reputable music producers, and these songs will be released as digital singles. Voting of each contestant is conducted during the performances. The winning team for each gender in this mission will have their songs labelled as title tracks in the single albums categorised by gender and the 2 songs' music videos will be directed by well-known directors Hong Won-ki and Lee Gi-taek. Plus, every contestant in the winning team will receive a benefit of additional online votes (1st placed contestant gets 10,000 additional votes, 2nd placed contestant gets 7,000 additional votes, and every other contestant in the team gets 5,000 additional votes), which can help in their rankings by the end of the 3rd voting round.

UNI+ B (Episode 11) 
Color key

UNI+ G (Episode 12) 
Color key

Final Mission: Final Stage Battle
The remaining contestants after the 3rd Voting Announcement will form 2 teams of 9 for each gender, through random picking of 1 of the 2 newly produced songs for each gender.

Uni+ G (Episode 14)

Uni+ B (Episode 14)

Discography

THE UNI+ 마이턴 (My turn)

THE UNI+ 빛 (Last One)

THE UNI+ Shine

The UNI+ B Step 1

The UNI+ G Step 1

The UNI+ Final

Ratings 
In the ratings below, the highest rating for the show will be in red, and the lowest rating for the show will be in blue each year.

Aftermath
 A fan-meeting for UNB and UNI.T was held at Blue Square iMarket Hall on March 3, 2018.
 UNB debuted with their first EP Boyhood with the lead single "Feeling" on April 7, 2018. They followed up with a comeback through the mini album "Black Heart" on June 28. The title track "Black Heart" features former The Unit contestants Jungha (formerly of Beatwin), Anne (of S.I.S) and Hangyul (of IM), together with DIA member Jueun as back-up performers.
 UNI.T debuted with their first EP Line with "No More" as its lead single on May 18, 2018. The group pre-released the single "Begin With the End" on September 15, before releasing their second and final mini album "Begin With The End", with the title track "I Mean" on September 18. ZN will not be involved in this comeback due to Japanese promotions with her group Laboum. On October 12, 2018 the group performed "I Mean" and "Begin With The End" for the last time at Music Bank and later on the same day they held their last fan-meeting as a group, after which they have disbanded.

 Soya returned as a soloist with the single "Show" on January 31, 2018. She released another single "Oasis" on April 18, 2018. With B.I.G member and fellow former The Unit contestant Heedo as featuring, she released a single titled Y-shirt (Deep Inside) on July 31, 2018.
 Kang Min-hee returned as a soloist on February 14, 2018, with the single "Toddle".
 Lena participated in Produce 101 China.
 Seol Ha-yoon returned as a trot singer with a cover of LPG's "Ring My Heart" on April 13, 2018.
 Jeup, Taeho, Jian and Ungjae returned to Imfact with the single "The Light" on April 17, 2018.
 Sangil, Suhyun and Sebin returned to Snuper with the EP Blossom on April 24, 2018.
 Kanto returned as a soloist on May 15, 2018 with the EP Repetition.
 Euna Kim debuted in duo KHAN with former The Ark member Jeon Min-ju on May 23, 2018 with the single "I'm Your Girl?". However, after three years of inactivity, she announced her retirement from the entertainment industry on May 24, 2021.
 Yena returned to G-reyish with the single "Remind" on May 24, 2018.
 Junghoon and Kyeongha returned to TST with the single "Love Story" on May 25, 2018. However, on June 11, it was announced that Kyeongha left the group due to him being found guilty of sexual assault.
 Jun returned to A.C.E with the single "Take Me Higher" on June 8, 2018.
 Yeoeun, Yoomin and Chahee returned to Melody Day with the single "Restless" on June 29, 2018. The group officially disbanded on December 26, 2018.
 Current UNB member Ji Han-sol debuted as a member of Newkidd with the single "Shooting Star" on July 25, 2018.
 Rockhyun returned to 100% with the single "Grand Bleu" on July 26, 2018. This is also the group's first single since the death of leader Seo Min-woo, who also auditioned for the show but failed to receive any boots. The group disbanded on September 27, 2021.
 Taro returned to H.B.Y and together with fellow H.B.Y members Jisan and Kyuhyuck, they formed a sub-unit of the group "H.B.Y (TaJiHyuck)". They released the single "Waiting" on July 26, 2018.
 Yujeong and Haein, together with current UNI.T member ZN, returned to Laboum with the single album "Between Us" on July 27, 2018.
 Somyi, together with current UNI.T member Yebin, returned to DIA with the mini album "Summer Ade" on August 9, 2018.
 Lex, together with current UNB member Euijin, returned to Bigflo with "Upside Down" on August 18, 2018, but promoted the song a week before its release.
 Lee Ju-hyeon participated in KBS dance survival show "Dancing High". She subsequently debuted with girl group Lightsum in June 2021.
 The band MAS was revealed to re-debut under the new band name Onewe. They made their official re-debut with their single "Reminisce About All" on May 13, 2019.
 After UNI.T disbanded, NC.A released "I'm Fine" on October 13, 2018.
 Timoteo and current UNB member Go Ho-jung, returned to Hotshot and the group released a mini album "Early Flowering" on November 15, 2018. The group disbanded on March 30, 2021.
 It was announced that Casper will participate in Idol Producer Season 2 but he left the show after the first episode.
 Hangyul participated in Produce X 101 and became a member of winning group X1. He subsequently became a member of BAE173 after X1's disbandment. 
 Yuji, Sandy and Haeun returned to APPLE.B but the group had disbanded. Sandy left her company, while Yuji and Haeun re-debuted with 3YE on May 21, 2019 with the single "DMT (Do Ma Thang)".
 Good Day had disbanded.
 Chaesol, Jiwon, Viva and Lucky re-debuted with Cignature on February 4, 2020 with the single "Nun Nu Nan Na". The latter three re-debuted with new stage names Jeewon, Sunn and Belle respectively.
 Genie re-debuted with Redsquare on May 19, 2020, under the stage name Green, with the single album "Prequel". Redsquare subsequently disbanded and had rebranded as Irris, where she re-debuted again under the stage name I.L.
 Yujeong and Eunji returned to Brave Girls with the release of the digital single "We Ride" on August 14, 2020. The group got a sudden rise in popularity after their song "Rollin" became viral in 2021. The group got their first win on March 14, 2021 with "Rollin".
 Tae.E has re-debuted with girl group Lunarsolar on September 2, 2020 with the single "Oh Ya Ya Ya", under the new stage name Jian.
 After UNB's Disband, Feeldog returned to Big Star. However the group disbanded a few months later due to the expiration of members' contracts, He then participated in Street Man Fighter under the crew "Bank Two Brothers".

Explanatory notes

References

External links
 
 

 
K-pop television series
South Korean reality television series
2017 South Korean television series debuts
Korean-language television shows
South Korean variety television shows
Korean Broadcasting System original programming
Music competitions in South Korea
2018 South Korean television series endings